The men's lead competition in sport climbing at the 2022 World Games took place on 16 July 2022 at the Sloss Furnaces in Birmingham, United States.

Results

References 

Men's lead